A1A may refer to:

 Florida State Road A1A
 A1A (album), a 1974 album by Jimmy Buffett
 Alpha-1 antitrypsin, a protease inhibitor secreted by the liver
 Several branches of A1 motorway in Switzerland numbered as A1a, located separately in Geneva, Lausanne and Vaud
 continuous wave modulation with Morse code.